State Route 2 (SR 2) is a  west–to–east state highway in the U.S. state of Tennessee. It begins in Murfreesboro, in Rutherford County, and ends near Farragut in Loudon County. The route is both a primary and secondary route. Most of the route is unsigned.

It travels southeast from Rutherford County toward Chattanooga and then northeast from there to Loudon County. As nearly the entire route travels concurrent with U.S. Highways, the designation "Tennessee State Route 2" is seldomly used by the general public. The only exception would be a small portion of the route that runs parallel to Interstate 24 (I-24) near Kimball. This portion has been removed from the U.S. Highway system and is no longer part of U.S. Route 41 (US 41); but the highway still exists and is in use. This is the only section of SR 2 with its own route signed (shown as a secondary state route).

Route description

Rutherford County

SR 2 begins in Rutherford County in Murfreesboro as a secondary route where US 41 leaves a concurrency with US 70S/SR 1. US 41 goes southeast as Southeast Broad Street, now concurrent with SR 2. SR 2/US 41 immediately intersect SR 99 (Bradyville Pike), which it was also concurrent with, before leaving Murfreesboro. It becomes Manchester Pike and closely parallels I-24 before entering Coffee County.

Coffee County

After entering Coffee County, the concurrency passes through the community of Beechgrove, and becomes Murfreesboro Highway. They intersect SR 64 (Gossburg Road), which connects to Wartrace and Bradyville, and then SR 280 (McBrides Branch Road) before continuing southeast. They have an interchange with I-24 and continue into Manchester, becoming Hillsboro Blvd in downtown, and intersecting SR 53 (Woodbury Highway), which is also its southern terminus and it connects to Bradyville, then SR 55 (McArthur Street), which connects to McMinnville and Tullahoma, before intersecting I-24 once again and leaving town as Hillsboro Highway.

US 41/SR 2 then continue southeast, and paralleling I-24, they enter the community of Hillsboro and intersect SR 127 (Winchester Highway), which connects to Winchester and Viola, and then they go to the community of Pelham and intersect SR 50 (Payne Cove Road), which connects to Alatamont and Alto. They still continue southeast and enter Grundy.

Grundy County

They rise onto the Cumberland Plateau and enters Monteagle as Dixie Highway. SR 2/US 41 has an intersection with becomes US 41A, SR 56, and SR 15, where SR 2/US 41 becomes concurrent with SR 56 as they enter town from the southwest as West Main Street. The concurrency continues east through downtown as West Main Street before becoming simply Main Street east of downtown. US 41 and SR 56 leave the concurrency and turn north as Fairmont Avenue before going northeast to Tracy City. SR 2 turns south as Dixie Lee Highway (alone yet still unsigned) and enters Marion County before the highway becomes concurrent with I-24/US 64 as the interstate starts to descend into a valley and Marion County.

Marion County

Once in the valley, SR 2 leaves the concurrency at Martin Springs via Martin Springs Road and Ladds Cove Road. It becomes Battle Creek Road and continues southeast, closely paralleling I-24/US 64 as it does so. It then crosses over the interstate without an interchange and turns south and then southeast once again as it parallels I-24 into Kimball.

Once in Kimball, SR 2 becomes concurrent with US 64 (which leaves the interstate just shortly before this point) and US 72, which goes through South Pittsburg, and moves northeast through downtown Kimball as Main St and then continues northeast to Jasper as Lee Highway. Entering Jasper, the concurrency intersects US 41/SR 150. Here, US 41 joins the concurrency while SR 150 terminates at the intersection. A short distance later, it intersects SR 28 (Valley View Highway), which connects to Sequatchie and Whitwell. Another short distance later, they intersect SR 27 (Griffith Highway), which connects to Powells Crossroads before leaving Jasper.

The concurrency moves southeast once again as Lee Highway before crossing Nickajack Lake/Tennessee River on the Marion Memorial Bridge and turning north and entering Haletown and  intersecting SR 134 (J E Clouse Highway), which connects to Whiteville and SR 156. They then continue northeast, then south as the highway parallels the Tennessee River Gorge and works around Lookout Mountain. The highway continues to change directions as it becomes Cummings Highway and enters Tiftonia in Hamilton County.

Hamilton County

As It once again intersects I-24 and then intersects US 11/SR 38 (Birmingham Highway). SR 38 terminates her while US 11 joins the concurrency. They then intersect SR 318 (Old Wauhatchie Pike), which is a short connection to SR 148 and Lookout Mountain and then continues eastward into Chattanooga. In Chattanooga, SR 17 (Tennessee Avenue), which also connects to Lookout Mountain and also SR 58, enters the concurrency as it becomes Broad Street and travels northeast into downtown.

In downtown, the concurrency once again intersects I-24 and continues northeast, intersecting SR 58 (West 20th Street) two blocks later. US 64 and US 11 leave the concurrency here while US 41 and SR 17 leave the concurrency after five more blocks. US 72 terminates at this intersection (West Main Street) while US 76 begins and follows US 41/SR 17 southeast. SR 2, still Broad Street and unsigned, continues north for several more blocks and then turns southeast as East Martin Luther King Blvd, at the intersection with SR 316. SR 2 then intersects SR 8 (Market Street) immediately afterwards. SR 2 then becomes Bailey Avenue and once again becomes concurrent with SR 17 (South Willow Street) and then US 64/US 11 (Dodds Avenue) as SR 17 leaves and proceeds south with US 64/US 11.

US 64, US 11, and SR 2 go southeast as McCallie Avenue and through the Missionary Ridge Tunnel. Coming out of the tunnel, the concurrency becomes Brainard Road, at an intersection with SR 320 (East Brainerd Road), and continues southeast for several blocks. It turns northeast and intersects SR 153, then it becomes Lee Highway and continues northeast as it leaves Chattanooga.

The concurrency briefly overlaps SR 317 (Bonny Oaks Drive) before the highways leave SR 317 (Old Lee Highway) and become concurrent to I-75. During this intersection, Tennessee State Route 2 becomes a Primary route for the first time. The concurrency goes northeast for several miles before US 64, US 11, and SR 2 leave and once again become Lee Highway as they pass Through Ooltewah and intersect SR 321 (Main Street/Old Lee Highway). The concurrency enters Bradley County and soon intersects US 74/US 64 Bypass/SR 311 (APD-40), a bypass around Cleveland.

Bradley County

US 64, US 11, and SR 2 continue northeast into downtown Cleveland as Lee Highway until U S 64 splits from the concurrency with SR 40 as SR 40 starts at this intersection. US 11/SR 2 turns north as Keith Street SW and then Keith Street NW and intersects SR 312 (Inman Street). The concurrency turns northeast and intersects SR 60 (25th Street/APD-40), which goes to US 64/US 74 (Waterlevel Highway), I-75, and Georgetown, and then SR 74 before leaving Cleveland. The highway once again becomes Lee Highway, then becomes Hiwassee Street as it intersects SR 308 (Lauderdale Memorial Highway), which goes to I-75 and Georgetown, and goes through Charleston. US 11/SR 2 then crosses the Hiwassee River and enters Calhoun in McMinn County.

McMinn County

The concurrency remains as Lee Highway through Calhoun and intersects and has a short concurrency with SR 163 (Lamonville Road/Bowater Road) and then continues to the northeast. US 11 Business splits away in Riceville with SR 39 (Riceville Road) and goes northeast through downtown Athens as US 11/SR 2 continues northeast, briefly running a concurrency with SR 39 in Riceville before it heads into downtown concurrent with US 11 BUS, and around the northwest side of downtown Athens as Congress Parkway. It then intersects SR 30 (Decatur Pike) before leaving Athens. Just north of Athens, US 11 BUS/SR 305 (Ingleside Avenue) intersect US 11/SR 2 where US 11 BUS terminates. SR 305 continues through the intersection and northeast to I-75. US 11/SR 2 continues northeast as Congress Parkway and into Niota where it becomes Willson Street and intersects SR 309 (Union Grove Road), a connector to I-75. US 11/SR 2 continues northeast and crosses into Monroe County.

Monroe County

Continuing as a primary state route, It then enters Sweetwater and intersects SR 68 at which point US 11/SR 2 becomes South Main Street. In downtown Sweetwater, it changes to North Main Street and briefly turns north before turning northeast once again and intersects SR 322 (Oakland Road), a connector to I-75 and Vonore before leaving town as Lee Highway.

Loudon County

They then enter Loudon County and moves through the small town of Philadelphia, intersecting SR 323 (Pond Creek Road), a connector to I-75. US 11/SR 2 continues northeast as Lee Highway and into Loudon. It intersects SR 72 and enters downtown. It goes straight through town as Mulberry Street and then crosses the Tennessee River. After crossing the river, US 11/SR 2 once again becomes Lee Highway and intersect SR 324 (Sugar Limb Road), a connector to I-75. They then leave Loudon continues generally northeast into Lenoir City.

In Lenoir City, the concurrency becomes West Broadway St and then East Broadway St before intersecting the US 321, SR 73, and SR 95 (Lamar Alexander Parkway) concurrency in downtown. US 11/SR 2 then leaves Lenoir City and goes north. SR 2 becomes secondary once again after its intersection with US 321 until its end; It turns northeast, but then goes north again until SR 2 terminates at US 70/SR 1 in Dixie Lee Junction. US 11 then continues with US 70/SR 1 into Knox County (as Kingston Pike) and into Farragut and Knoxville.

History

Junction list

See also 
 
 
 List of state routes in Tennessee

References

Tennessee Department of Transportation (24 January 2003). "State Highway and Interstate List 2003".

External links
 

002
Transportation in Rutherford County, Tennessee
Transportation in Coffee County, Tennessee
Transportation in Grundy County, Tennessee
Transportation in Marion County, Tennessee
Transportation in Hamilton County, Tennessee
Transportation in Bradley County, Tennessee
Transportation in McMinn County, Tennessee
Transportation in Monroe County, Tennessee
Transportation in Loudon County, Tennessee
U.S. Route 11
U.S. Route 41